Ragini Upadhyaya Grela (also spelled as Ragini Upadhyay Grela) (born 9 November 1959), popularly known as Ragini Upadhyaya, is a Nepalese fine artist, lyricist, and philanthropist. She served as the Chancellor of the second council of Nepal Academy of Fine Arts. She is known for her fusion of traditional mythology, symbolism, and modernism in her surrealist and abstract paintings. Her art often features social commentary and feminist or matriarchal themes. 

Major influences on Upadhyaya's art style include Salvador Dalí, Vincent van Gogh and George Segal. She has received numerous national and international awards and honors. She is also the founding chairperson of the Women Artists Group. Her paintings are on display in various locations, including the World Bank Museum, Bradford Museum England, Fukuoka Asian Art Museum, Japan, SAARC Building Kathmandu Nepal, and Tribhuvan International Airport. She is a member of the working committees of the BP Koirala Foundation and the Barbara Peace Foundation. She is also the chairperson for the Shivata Love Foundation, an organization with which she engaged in social work through an education program for daughters.

Childhood
She was born to a Brahmin family as the fifth child to father Kanta Prasad and mothert Sushila Upadhyaya in Kathmandu. She spent most of her childhood in Bettiah, India. 

Her ancestors lived in Chundi Ramgha, Tanahun District, but her grandfather, Pandit Devi Prasad Upadhyaya, moved to Ramnagar in search of better educational opportunities for his children. Ramnagar was formerly part of Nepal before the Sugauli Treaty was signed, which transferred the territory to India. Some members of her extended family still live in Varanasi, India.

Education 
Her formal education began when her family enrolled in a Catholic school in Bettiah, India, at an early age, at a time when the traditional Nepali society did not allow girls to receive an education.

After completing her primary education, Ragini attended the Crosthwaite Girls College in Allahabad. She then enrolled at the Lucknow College of Arts and Crafts in Lucknow, India, where she completed her bachelor's degree in Fine Arts in 1982. Despite her family's disapproval, Ragini studied printing for three years at Gadhi Art Village in New Delhi.

After returning to Nepal in 1986, Ragini took advanced lessons in printmaking in the Oxford Printmakers Co-operative in 1987 on a British Council scholarship. In 1989, she received a scholarship to study at the Kunst Academy in Stuttgart, Germany.

Career 
In 1979, Bishweshwar Prasad Koirala and Bal Krishna Sama attended Ragini's non-profit exhibition of her paintings. This event brought considerable attention to her work and marked her entrance into the progressive circles in Nepal.

Ragini rose to further prominence at the inauguration of her exhibition by Queen Aishwarya Shah on the birth anniversary of King Birendra in 1986. This led her to receive a scholarship to study in England, with encouragement and support from her husband to enter the field.

Intending to establish a modern and well-equipped fine arts museum in Nepal, she was appointed the first woman Chancellor of the Nepal Academy of Fine Arts in 2014, by Sushil Koirala, the Prime Minister of Nepal.

With help and encouragement from her father, Ragini established herself in the field of fine arts. She has produced more than 65 solo exhibitions, with the first in 1979, and dozens of group exhibitions in more than two dozen countries worldwide. Her art has been received positively by others like Lain Singh Bandel, Bal Krishna Sama, BP Koirala, and Abhi Subedi.

Philanthropy 
Ragini is the chairperson of the Shivata Love Foundation, which she founded in 2017 in the memory of her eponymous late daughter, Shivata Upadhayay Grela, who died from meningitis B in February 2016 at the age of 20.

The foundation aims to raise awareness for the meningitis B vaccine, as well as to promote the education of underprivileged girls in Nepal through scholarships.

Professions 

 Former Chancellor - Nepal Academy of Fine Arts
 Member - BP Koirala India-Nepal Foundation
 Member - Barbara Foundation
 Director - Artist Proof Gallery, Nepal
 Founder President - Women Artists Group Nepal
 Founder President - Shivata Love Foundation

Medals and awards 
National Exhibition Award, 1979, Nepal
 National Exhibition Award, 1985, Nepal
 National Exhibition Award, 1988, Nepal
 Kate & Robert Wilson Award, 1986, Bradford, UK
 Birendra-Aishwarya Memorial Medal, 2002, Nepal
 50 Talented Women of Nepal, 2005, The Bose, Nepal
 Sankalp Honour, Sankalp Nepal Welfare Society, Nepal
 'Best Student Award in 100 Years of Lucknow College of Arts and Crafts', Lucknow, India
 Toran Kumari Art Culture Award, Nepal
 Senior Artist Honor, Nepal Chamber of Commerce Artists Association, Nepal
 Bhadrakumari Seva Sadan Honour, Nepal
 Consensus Respect for Social Work, Nepal
 Honorary Life Member, Art Circle, U.P. Lucknow, India
 Glapev Honors 2019 Artist of the Year, Bharat Nirman Foundation, India
 Shabdayatra Mahila Pratibha Honour, Shabdayatra Prakashan, Banepa, Kavrepalanchok

Photo gallery

External links 

Ragini Art & Life (official website)
Ragini Upadhyay - A leading modern Nepali Artist (retrospective book)

References 

Nepalese painters
Nepalese artists
1959 births
Living people
Ecofeminists
Feminists
20th-century Nepalese painters
21st-century Nepalese painters